The 1999 Kärcher Canadian Junior Curling Championships were held February 6-14 at the Kelowna Curling Club in Kelowna, British Columbia. The winning teams represented Canada at the 1999 World Junior Curling Championships.

Men's

Teams

Standings

Results

Draw 1

Draw 2

Draw 3

Draw 4

Draw 5

Draw 6

Draw 7

Draw 8

Draw 9

Draw 10

Draw 11

Draw 12

Draw 13

Playoffs

Tiebreaker

Semifinal

Final

Women's

Teams

Standings

Results

Draw 1

Draw 2

Draw 3

Draw 4

Draw 5

Draw 6

Draw 7

Draw 8

Draw 9

Draw 10

Draw 11

Draw 12

Draw 13

Playoffs

Semifinal

Final

Qualification

Ontario
The Ontario Junior Curling Championships were held at the Minden Curling Club in Minden, with the finals on January 10. 

After posting a 7-0 round robin record, Ottawa's Jenn Hanna rink had to be beaten twice by Milton's Julie Reddick for the women's championship. Reddick won both games, 6-3 and 6-5.

In the men's final, John Morris of the Ottawa Curling Club defeated the neighbouring Rideau Curling Club Sebastien Robillard rink 7-4. Robillard had to win two tiebreaker matches before beating the Tam Heather club's Daryl Britt in the semifinal, 9-3.

References

External links
Men's statistics
Women's statistics

Canadian Junior Curling Championships
Curling in British Columbia
Sport in Kelowna
Canadian Junior Curling Championships
1999 in British Columbia
February 1999 sports events in Canada